Yevheniy Yuriyovych Bilokin (born 16 June 1998) is a Ukrainian professional footballer who plays as a midfielder for Polish club Górnik Polkowice, on loan from Prochowiczanka Prochowice.

Club career
He made his Ukrainian Second League debut for FC Illichivets-2 Mariupol on 24 July 2016 in a game against FC Rukh Vynnyky.

References

External links
 

1998 births
Living people
Ukrainian footballers
Ukrainian expatriate footballers
Association football midfielders
FC Illichivets-2 Mariupol players
FC Mariupol players
FC Metalist 1925 Kharkiv players
SC Tavriya Simferopol players
Górnik Polkowice players
Ukrainian Premier League players
Ukrainian First League players
Ukrainian Second League players
IV liga players
Ukrainian expatriate sportspeople in Poland
Expatriate footballers in Poland